Vasyukovo is a rural locality (a village) in Pokrovskoye Rural Settlement, Vashkinsky District, Vologda Oblast, Russia. The population was 15 as of 2002.

Geography 
Vasyukovo is located 79 km northwest of Lipin Bor (the district's administrative centre) by road. Timoshino is the nearest rural locality.

References 

Rural localities in Vashkinsky District